Sandnesfjorden is a fjord in Agder county, Norway. The fjord originates at the large inland lake Vegår and flows south and east through the river Storelva before emptying into the coastal lake Nævestadfjorden.

The Norwegian County Road 411 crosses the fjord where the river Lagelva meets the fjord.  The village of Sandnes is located on the southern shore of the fjord.  There are many islands at the mouth of the fjord, just south of the town of Risør.

See also
 List of Norwegian fjords

References

Fjords of Agder
Risør
Tvedestrand